The 2023 Erskine Flying Fleet men's volleyball team represents Erskine College in the 2023 NCAA Division I & II men's volleyball season. The Flying Fleet, led by sixth year head coach Justin Brubaker, were picked to finish sixth in the Conference Carolinas coaches preseason poll.

Season highlights
Will be filled in as the season progresses.

Roster
{| class="toccolours" style="border-collapse:collapse; font-size:90%;"
|-
| colspan="7" style=background:#6A142C;color:#FFFFFF; border: 2px solid #FFC72C; | 
|-
|-
|width="03"| 
|valign="top"|
Defensive Specialist/Libero
3 Mikey Widmyer - Freshman
4 Alex Ruiz - Sophomore
10 Tristan Gaddy- Freshman 
22 Justin Rendon -  SeniorMiddle Blockers
5 Davi Ramos - Freshman9 Wiktor Ankurowski - Freshman18 Benjamin Jansen -  Junior 
19 Logyn Wells - Freshman24 Shayo Asiru - Sophomore26 Jon Fuller -  Junior27 Jacob Mullen - Freshman|width="15"| 
| valign="top" |
Outside Hitters
1 Noah Van - Junior6 Casey DiRisio - Freshman13 Kacper Rybarczyk - Junior20 Pablo Zamar - Sophomore21 Kaleb Hinson - Freshman 
23 Aidon Love - Sophomore 
25 Joshua Carlos - Sophomore 
28 Edgerrin Austin -  Junior|width="15"| 
| valign="top" |
Opposite Hitters
11 Jason Sall -  Junior14 Tome Filkov-  Junior 
29 Charles Byrd - Freshman 

Setters
2 Umar Abdullah -  Junior8 Michael Moscatelli -  Junior12 Gino Briglio - Freshman15 Francisco Pomar -  Junior|width="20"| 
|}

Future Players
True Bauer

Schedule
TV/Internet Streaming information:
All home games will be streamed on Conference Carolinas DN. Most road games will also be televised or streamed by the schools television or streaming service.

 *-Indicates conference match.
 Times listed are Eastern Time Zone.

Announcers for televised games
Tusculum: Ben Auten 
Central State: Ben Auten 
Tusculum: Brian Stayton''
Fort Valley: 
Grand Canyon: 
UC San Diego: 
Alderson Broaddus: 
Charleston (WV): 
Belmont Abbey: 
Lees-McRae: 
King: 
Barton: 
Mount Olive: 
North Greenville: 
Belmont Abbey: 
Benedict: 
Kentucky State: 
Lewis: 
Emmanuel: 
Mount Olive: 
Barton: 
King:
Lees-McRae: 
North Greenville: 
Limestone:
Emmanuel:

References

2023 in sports in South Carolina
2023 NCAA Division I & II men's volleyball season
Erskine
Erskine Flying Fleet